Bid-e Shirin-e Do (also Romanized as Bīd-e Shīrīn-e Do; also known as Bīd-e Shīrīn) is a village in Hanza Rural District, Hanza District, Rabor County, Kerman Province, Iran. At the 2006 census, its population was 160, in 34 families.

References 

Populated places in Rabor County